I Knew It Was You: Rediscovering John Cazale is a 2009 American documentary film about actor John Cazale, directed by Richard Shepard and produced by Brett Ratner, Stacey Reiss and Richard Shepard.

Background
The film received its title from a famed line from The Godfather Part II directed toward Cazale's character of Fredo Corleone, and acts as a retrospective of Cazale's distinguished acting career, which was cut short at age 42 when he died of lung cancer.

The film was produced with the cooperation of Meryl Streep, who was living with Cazale at the time of his death. It features interviews with a number of his notable co-stars and directors.

Release and recognition
I Knew It Was You debuted at the 2009 Sundance Film Festival, and had its television premiere in Spain on June 9, 2009. It was released on DVD in Fall 2010 by Oscilloscope Laboratories.

Critical response
Victoria Large wrote that "while I Knew it Was You works as a wonderful career retrospective for fans or a great primer for newcomers, the real power of the piece lies in the juxtaposition of the highlights of Cazale's career with the warm remembrances of his friends and the biographical facts of his life". Don R. Lewis of Film Threat felt that the film did not properly cover Cazale's early life, writing "From its awkward running time of 40 minutes to the way director Richard Shepard completely skims over the man's life outside of acting, I just didn't feel there was enough going on to make this doc truly special. That being said, I Knew It Was You is an excellent tribute piece to a fine actor and a great way to learn more about the roles and work ethic of Cazale".

Awards and nominations
 2009, Won audience award at Newport International Film Festival.

References

External links
 

2009 films
Documentary films about actors
American documentary films
Films directed by Richard Shepard
2000s English-language films
2000s American films